The 2015 Sibiu Open was a professional tennis tournament played on clay courts. It was the fourth edition of the tournament which was part of the 2015 ATP Challenger Tour. It took place in Sibiu, Romania between 21 and 27 September 2015.

Singles main-draw entrants

Seeds

 1 Rankings are as of September 14, 2015.

Other entrants
The following players received wildcards into the singles main draw:
  Victor Vlad Cornea
  Victor Crivoi
  Michał Dembek
  Dragoș Dima

The following players received entry from the qualifying draw:
  Steven Diez
  Marc Giner
  Petru-Alexandru Luncanu
  Riccardo Sinicropi

The following player received entry as a lucky loser:
  Andrei Stefan Apostol

Champions

Singles

 Adrian Ungur def.  Pere Riba, 6–4, 3–6, 7–5

Doubles

 Victor Crivoi /  Petru-Alexandru Luncanu def.  Ilija Bozoljac /  Dušan Lajović, 6–4, 6–3

External links
Official Website

Sibiu Open
Sibiu Open
2015 in Romanian tennis